The 1995 Latvian Individual Speedway Championship was the 21st Latvian Individual Speedway Championship season. The final took place on 14 September 1995 in Daugavpils, Latvia.

Final
 September 14, 1995
  Daugavpils

Speedway in Latvia
1995 in Latvian sport
1995 in speedway